Elizabeth Newell Hernandez (born ) is an American female road and track cyclist. She competed in the points race event at the 2014 UCI Track Cycling World Championships. She is part of the UCI women's team named Colavita/Bianchi.

Major results
2011
1st  National Track Championships - Points Race
1st  National Track Championships - Omnium
2012
2012 Pan American Cycling Championships 
3rd Omnium
3rd Individual Pursuit
3rd Team Pursuit (with Cari Higgins and Jennifer Valente)
2013
Pan American Track Championships
1st  Scratch Race
3rd Omnium
3rd Individual Pursuit
2nd Points Race, International Belgian Open
2nd Points Race - Track World Cup I - Manchester 
3rd Team Pursuit - Los Angeles Grand Prix (with Cari Higgins, Lauren Tamayo and Jade Wilcoxson)
2014
1st  Team Pursuit, Pan American Track Championships (with Amber Gaffney, Kimberly Geist and Jennifer Valente) 
1st Points Race - Grand Prix of Colorado Springs 
2nd Omnium - Grand Prix of Colorado Springs
2nd Points Race - Fastest Man on Wheels 
2nd Points Race - Festival of Speed 
2015
1st Individual Pursuit - U.S. Vic Williams Memorial Grand Prix 
3rd Points Race - Festival of Speed

References

External links
 Profile at cyclingarchives.com
 

1982 births
Living people
American track cyclists
American female cyclists
Place of birth missing (living people)
21st-century American women